Brull may refer to:
 El Brull, municipality in Barcelona Province, Catalonia, Spain
 Mató cheese, typical Catalan cheese (alternative name)
 Brossat, a Catalan cheese

See also
 Brüll, a surname